Manhattan General Hospital is a defunct hospital that also used the name Manhattan Hospital and relocated more than once, using buildings that serially served more than one hospital, beginning in the 1920s.

History
Alfred A. Richman, who had opened a "private sanitarium at 50 West Seventy-fourth Street" in 1925, subsequently "founded Manhattan General Hospital." The name was transplanted to more than one location: "Lying-In
moved uptown, and Manhattan General Hospital moved in. And when Manhattan General
went uptown" the building became still another medical facility: a drug-abuse treatment center. The sale of Manhattan General'''s 161 East Ninetieth Street 9-story building to Beth David Hospital facilitated purchasing an adjacent site to construct an 11-story building.Manhattan General merged with Mount Sinai Beth Israel in 1964 and closed; the MGH'' buildings became co-op apartments.

References

External links
 MGH's 1930s use of the 161 East 90th Street building

Defunct hospitals in Manhattan